Schistura nilgiriensis is a species of ray-finned fish in the genus Schistura.

Footnotes 
 

N
Fish described in 1987